The women's 400 metres event at the 2003 Summer Universiade was held in Daegu, South Korea with the final on 25–27 August.

Medalists

Results

Heats

Final

References
Results
Heat 2 & 3 results

Athletics at the 2003 Summer Universiade
2003 in women's athletics
2003